"Tumble in the Rough" is a 1997 promo single by the American alternative rock band Stone Temple Pilots. It was originally recorded for their 1996 album Tiny Music... Songs from the Vatican Gift Shop. It has the distinction of being the only song on any of the group's studio albums for which Scott Weiland solely wrote both the lyrics and music.

Chart positions
The song never became as popular as many of the band's other singles. However, it charted on the Mainstream Rock Tracks and the Modern Rock Tracks.

References

1997 singles
1996 songs
Stone Temple Pilots songs
Songs written by Scott Weiland
Song recordings produced by Brendan O'Brien (record producer)